In philosophy, meta-rights are the entitlements of individuals to their rights, including the possibility to waive, transfer or sell their rights. When we talk of the rights of individuals, we do not always distinguish between rights which can be waived or sold and rights which are non-negotiable. Yet that distinction and often the distinction is made implicitly. When we say a person has a right to her house, we usually mean that she also has the meta right to sell the right. On the other hand, when we say a person has the right to his body parts, we usually assume this comes without the accompanying meta right to sell these rights. Economic efficiency usually comes with having rights which come together with the meta right to sell the right. It is arguable that we should be much more explicit about when rights come together with meta rights and when without, and the moral basis that accompany these decisions.

See also
 Ethical subjectivism
 Fact–value distinction
 Is–ought problem
 Meta-ethics
 Moral realism
 Normative ethics

References

Political philosophy
Rights